This is a list of people who have served as Lord Lieutenant of Cambridgeshire. The title Lord Lieutenant is given to the British monarch's personal representative in the counties of the United Kingdom. Lord Lieutenants are supported by an appointed Vice Lord Lieutenant and Deputy Lieutenants. Since 1715, all Lord Lieutenants have also been Custos Rotulorum of Cambridgeshire.

The current Lord-Lieutenant of Cambridgeshire is Mrs Julie Spence OBE QPM as of 4 April 2017.

Lord Lieutenants of Cambridgeshire to 1965
Incorporating the liberty of Isle of Ely, a county palatine from 1107 to 1535/6, declared a division of Cambridgeshire in 1837 when the secular powers of the Bishop of Ely ended. For the Soke of Peterborough to 1965, see Lord Lieutenant of Northamptonshire and for Huntingdonshire during this period,  Lord Lieutenant of Huntingdonshire.

The Marquess of Northampton 1547–?
The 1st Lord North 1557–1564
The 2nd Lord North 20 November 1569 – ?
unknown
The 2nd Lord North 8 April 1588 – 3 December 1600
vacant
The 1st Earl of Suffolk 17 July 1602– 28 May 1626
The 2nd Earl of Suffolk 15 June 1626 – 3 June 1640
The Lord Maynard 17 June 1640 – 17 December 1640 jointly with
The Lord North 22 October 1640 – 1642
Interregnum
The 3rd Earl of Suffolk 25 July 1660 – 9 March 1681
The Lord Alington 9 March 1681 – 1 February 1685
The Earl of Sandwich 1685 (did not serve; exercised in his absence by:)
The Earl of Ailesbury 4 March 1685 – 20 October 1685
vacant
The Lord Dover 26 November 1686 – 10 May 1689
The 1st Duke of Bedford 10 May 1689 – 7 September 1700
Lord Edward Russell 22 November 1700 – 27 November 1701
The 2nd Duke of Bedford 27 November 1701 – 26 May 1711
The 6th Lord North 6 December 1711 – 28 October 1715
The Earl of Orford 28 October 1715 – 26 November 1727
The Earl of Lincoln 28 March 1728 – 7 September 1728
The Lord Montfort 13 June 1729 – 24 July 1742
The Duke of Newcastle 24 July 1742 – 25 August 1757
The 2nd Earl of Hardwicke 25 August 1757 – 16 May 1790
The 3rd Earl of Hardwicke 3 July 1790 – 18 November 1834
The 4th Earl of Hardwicke 20 January 1834– 17 September 1873
Charles Watson Townley 20 January 1874 – 17 October 1893
Alexander Peckover, 1st Baron Peckover 11 December 1893 – 12 December 1906
The Viscount Clifden 12 December 1906 – 1915
Charles Adeane CB 25 October 1915 – 11 February 1943
Richard George Briscoe 15 May 1943 – 16 June 1958
Robert Henry Parker 16 June 1958 – 14 April 1965

Lord Lieutenants of Cambridgeshire and the Isle of Ely
The Lieutenancy became that of Cambridgeshire and Isle of Ely on 1 April 1965, when that administrative county was formed. For Huntingdon and Peterborough, see the separate Lord Lieutenant of Huntingdon and Peterborough.

Geoffrey Taylor Hurrell 14 April 1965 – 31 March 1974

Lord Lieutenants of Cambridgeshire from 1974
On 1 April 1974, the new non-metropolitan county of Cambridgeshire was formed from Cambridgeshire and Isle of Ely and Huntingdon and Peterborough. On 1 April 1998, the city of Peterborough ceded from Cambridgeshire as a unitary authority, but it continues to form part of that county for ceremonial purposes.

Geoffrey Taylor Hurrell 1 April 1974 – 26 March 1975 (former Lord Lieutenant of Cambridgeshire and Isle of Ely), with
Dennis George Ruddock Herbert, 2nd Baron Hemingford 1 April 1974 – ?, styled Lieutenant of Cambridgeshire
Hon. Peter Esmé Brassey 26 March 1975 – 9 March 1981
Sir Peter Proby, Bt 9 March 1981 – 1985
Michael Guy Molesworth Bevan 1985 – 2 March 1992
James Crowden CVO 3 July 1992 – 2002
Sir Hugh Duberly CBE CVO 20 August 2003 – 4 April 2017
Julie Spence OBE QPM 4 April 2017  present

Deputy Lieutenants
A deputy lieutenant of Cambridgeshire is commissioned by the Lord Lieutenant of Cambridgeshire. Deputy lieutenants support the work of the lord-lieutenant. There can be several deputy lieutenants at any time, depending on the population of the county. Their appointment does not terminate with the changing of the lord-lieutenant, but they usually retire at age 75.

19th Century
25 January 1831: William Henry Cheere, Esq.
25 January 1831: George Newton, Esq.
16 February 1831: John Bendyshe, Esq.
16 February 1831: Henry Hawkins, Esq.
16 February 1831: Richard Huddleston, Esq.
16 February 1831: Wedd William Nash, Esq.
16 February 1831: John Phillips, Esq.
16 February 1831: James Wortham, Esq.
25 February 1831: Ebenezer Foster, Esq.
25 February 1831: Robert Francis Pate, Esq.
25 February 1831: John Wing, Esq.

See also
High Sheriff of Cambridgeshire

References

External links

Lord Lieutenant of Cambridgeshire

Local government in Cambridgeshire
Cambridgeshire